Jaleq (also Romanized as Jāl'q, Jālaq, Jālk, and Jālq; also known as Kashān, Khooshab, Khūshāb, and Khvoshāb) 

New name: 

Golshan (persian: گلشن)

is a city in and the capital of Central District, in Golshan County, Sistan and Baluchestan Province, Iran. At the 2006 census, its population was 13,903, in 2,594 families. Jālq (native pronunciation) is Iran's easternmost city. Jaleq is near the border with Pakistan and is mainly inhabited by Iranian Baluchis. The name Jaleq is Persian and means "the trodden place".

References

Populated places in Saravan County
Cities in Sistan and Baluchestan Province